The Prix Gratien-Gélinas, originally known as Prime à la création du Fonds Gratien-Gélinas, is a Canadian theatre prize awarded for an original script with the aim of helping bring it to the stage. It was first awarded in 1994. Named in honour of Gratien Gélinas, it is considered the most important Canadian award recognizing emerging talent in francophone playwriting.

Winners 
 1994 - Règlement de contes, Yvan Bienvenue & Une tache sur la lune, Marie-Line Laplante (tie)
 1995 - Motel Hélène, Serge Boucher
 1997 - Couteau... Sept façons originales de tuer quelqu'un avec, Isabelle Hubert
 1998 - Dévoilement devant le notaire, Dominick Parenteau-Lebeuf
 1999 - Floes, Sébastien Harrisson
 2000 - Ceci n'est pas une pipe, Stéphane Hogue
 2001 - Le pays des genoux, Geneviève Billette
 2002 - 2025, l'année du Serpent, Philippe Ducros
 2003 - L'intimité, Emma Haché
 2004 - Le doux parfum du vide, Pascal Lafond
 2005 - Je suis d'un would be pays, François Godin
 2006 - Voiture américaine, Catherine Léger
 2007 - Buffet chinois, Nathalie Boisvert
 2008 - Transmissions, Justin Laramée
 2009 - Le chant de Georges Boivin, Martin Bellemare
 2010 - Faire des enfants, Éric Noël
 2011 - Billy (Les jours de hurlement), Fabien Cloutier
 2013 - La beauté du monde, Olivier Sylvestre
 2013 - L'écolière de Tokyo, Jean-Philippe Lehoux
 2014 - Danserault, Jonathan Bernier
 2015 - Hamster, Marianne Dansereau
 2016 - Histoire populaire et sensationnelle, Gabriel Plante
 2017 - La nuit du 4 au 5, Rachel Graton
 2018 - Une journée, Gabrielle Chapdelaine
 2019 - L'art de vivre, Liliane Gougeon Moisan

References 

French-language literary awards
Canadian dramatist and playwright awards
French-language literature in Canada